The 2010 Chilean telethon was the 23rd version of this telethon, the aim this year being to raise funds for the rehabilitation of children with motor disabilities. The event, which aired over 27 consecutive hours through the Chilean television channels grouped in the National Television Association (Anatel), was broadcast live from the Telethon Theatre on December 3 and 4 and from the National Stadium in its final segments, and was produced and directed by Mauricio Correa. The poster child was Cristóbal Galleguillos, born with no upper limbs and malformed legs. It is the second national telethon after the Chile helps Chile, aired in March of that year, to be broadcast in HDTV.  This version was performed 2 years after the previous because in December 2009 parliamentary and presidential elections took place. This was the first telethon to be held during the first government of Sebastián Piñera and as 2010 marked the nation's bicentennial year, it marked a historic climax to a year of celebrations and television specials, with the year's edition being a gift to the millions of Chileans who had helped the campaign through the decades.

After almost 28 hours of uninterrupted transmission, the amount collected during was CL$ 18,890,559,347 (USD$ 39,167,654), beating, a 13.87%, the original goal. On 21 December, the Fundación Teletón's Directorate gave the final figure achieved in this campaign, reaching a total of CL$24,420,293,420 (USD$50,632,995), 47.20% above the goal set.

Sponsors

References

External links 
 Fundación Teletón
 Asociación Nacional de Televisión de Chile
 Oritel

Telethon
Chilean telethons